Simplice Ribouem (born  5 December 1982) is a Cameroon-born Olympian weightlifter who competed for Cameroon up to 2006, and for Australia from 2009. He finished 13th in the 94kg event at the 2016 Summer Olympics.

Ribouem won bronze for Cameroon in the 85kg event at the 2006 Commonwealth Games. He was an Australian gold medallist at the 2010 Commonwealth Games, winning a gold medal in the 85kg event. Ribouem did not medal in the 2011 World Weightlifting Championships – Men's 94 kg. He won silver competing for Australia at the 2014 Commonwealth Games. Ribouem won a silver at the 2016 Oceania Weightlifting Championships.

Results 

Medalbox notes

References

External links 

1982 births
Living people
Sportspeople from Douala
Cameroonian emigrants to Australia
Australian male weightlifters
Weightlifters at the 2016 Summer Olympics
Olympic weightlifters of Australia
Weightlifters at the 2006 Commonwealth Games
Weightlifters at the 2010 Commonwealth Games
Weightlifters at the 2014 Commonwealth Games
Commonwealth Games medallists in weightlifting
Commonwealth Games bronze medallists for Cameroon
Commonwealth Games gold medallists for Australia
Commonwealth Games silver medallists for Australia
Medallists at the 2006 Commonwealth Games
Medallists at the 2010 Commonwealth Games
Medallists at the 2014 Commonwealth Games